This is a list of by-elections to Seanad Éireann, the senate of the Oireachtas, the legislature of Ireland, established in 1938. By-elections occur to fill vacant seats which can be caused by the death, resignation, disqualification or expulsion of a sitting senator. By-elections to the university constituencies are conducted on the same basis as general elections to these constituencies. By-elections to the vocational panels are held on a reduced electorate of members of the Oireachas only.

By-elections since 1938
By-elections in which seats changed parties are indicated with a grey background.

See also
List of Dáil by-elections
List of Irish politicians who changed party affiliation

References

 
Ireland, Seanad
By-elections, Seanad